Sérgio Marins (born 27 December 1969) is a Brazilian equestrian. He competed in two events at the 2004 Summer Olympics.

References

External links
 

1969 births
Living people
Brazilian male equestrians
Olympic equestrians of Brazil
Equestrians at the 2004 Summer Olympics
Sportspeople from Belo Horizonte